Vilshana is an urban-type settlement located in Zvenyhorodka Raion (district) of Cherkasy Oblast (province) in central Ukraine. It hosts the administration of Vilshana settlement hromada, one of the hromadas of Ukraine.  Population: 

Until 18 July 2020, Vilshana belonged to Horodyshche Raion. The raion was abolished in July 2020 as part of the administrative reform of Ukraine, which reduced the number of raions of Cherkasy Oblast to four. The area of Horodyshche Raion was split between Cherkasy and Zvenyhorodka Raions, with Vilshana being transferred to Zvenyhorodka Raion.

People from Vilshana
 Taras Shevchenko (1814–1851), later a leading Ukrainian poet, lived there as a boy, 1828–1831.
 Jan Stanisławski (Vilshana, 24 June 1860 – 6 January 1907, Kraków), Polish modernist painter, art educator, and founder and member of various innovative art groups and literary societies.
 Jerzy Różycki (1909–1942), Polish mathematician and cryptologist who played a crucial role in breaking German Enigma-machine ciphers before and during World War II

References

External links 
 
 

Urban-type settlements in Zvenyhorodka Raion
Populated places established in 1598